Tissandier is a surname, and may refer to:   
   
Gaston Tissandier (1843–1899), French chemist, meteorologist, aviator and editor
Albert Tissandier (1839–1906), Gaston's brother, French architect, aviator, illustrator, editor and archaeologist
Paul Tissandier (1881–1945), Gaston's son, French aviator
The Paul Tissandier Diploma - awarded in honour of Paul Tissandier.